Ramon Stanley Remy Leeuwin (born 1 September 1987) is a Surinamese professional footballer who plays as a centre-back for TEC in the Tweede Divisie. Born in the Netherlands, he represents the Suriname national team.

Career
Leeuwin is a defender who was born in Amsterdam and made his debut in professional football for FC Utrecht in the 2006–07 season. He later played for AGOVV, ADO Den Haag and Cambuur before returning to Utrecht in June 2014.

In August 2018, he signed a two-and-a-half-year contract with Danish Superliga club OB. Following his stint in Denmark, he signed a one-and-a-half-year contract at AZ. 

On 1 July 2021, Leeuwin joined Almere City, where he signed a one-year deal. After one season, he left professional football and joined Tweede Divisie club TEC.

International career
Born in the Netherlands, Leeuwin is of Surinamese descent. In March 2021, he has been called up to the national squad of Suriname by coach Dean Gorré after receiving the green light from FIFA to call-up Dutch origin players including several that currently play in the Netherlands. He made his debut for Suriname national football team on 24 March 2021 in a World Cup qualifier against the Cayman Islands.

Career statistics

References

External links
 

1987 births
Living people
Footballers from Amsterdam
Surinamese footballers
Suriname international footballers
Dutch footballers
Dutch sportspeople of Surinamese descent
Association football defenders
Eredivisie players
Eerste Divisie players
Tweede Divisie players
Danish Superliga players
FC Utrecht players
AGOVV Apeldoorn players
ADO Den Haag players
SC Cambuur players
Odense Boldklub players
AZ Alkmaar players
Almere City FC players
SV TEC players
Surinamese expatriate footballers
Dutch expatriate footballers
Expatriate men's footballers in Denmark
Surinamese expatriate sportspeople in Denmark
Dutch expatriate sportspeople in Denmark